Ranbir Singh Hooda (26 November 1914 - 1 February 2009) was an Indian politician from Haryana. He was a member of the Indian National Congress. He served as a minister in undivided Punjab and then in the Haryana government. His 100th birth anniversary celebration was inaugurated by President Pranab Mukherjee on 27 November 2014.

Early childhood 
Born into a Jat family on 26 November 1914, in Sanghi, a small village in Rohtak district of Undivided Punjab (now Haryana), Ranbir Singh Hooda got his initial education at his village school and later at the Gurukul  Bhainswal Kalan near Gohana ( Sonipat ) run by the Arya Samaj activist and social reformer, Bhagat Phool Singh.

Education 
After completing primary education, Ranbir Singh Hooda joined Vaish High School, Rohtak. He completed matriculation in 1933 and joined Government College, Rohtak for higher studies. He passed his FA examination in 1935. Later, he moved to Delhi and graduated from Ramjas College in 1937. He was conferred with an honorary degree of D.Litt. by Kurukshetra University in 2007.

Participation in freedom movement 
Ranbir Singh Hooda joined the Gandhian army in the 1930s to contribute towards India's freedom struggle. He was first arrested in 1941 for participating in a Satyagraha movement. He was put behind the bars several times during India's freedom struggle. In all, he spent three and a half years in rigorous imprisonment and was under house arrest for two years. He was imprisoned in different jails in Rohtak, Ambala, Hisar, Ferozepur, Lahore (Borstal), Lahore (Central), Multan and Sialkot. He remained closely associated with Mahatma Gandhi during the latter's visits to Rohtak and nearby districts of Punjab.

Political career 
The Indian National Congress party sent him to the Constituent Assembly in July 1947, largely owing to his contribution to the freedom movement. He was instrumental in the framing of the Indian Constitution and primarily voiced concerns of workers, peasants, and lower-caste people. He was also a member of the Provisional Parliament and served it in 1950–52. He contested the first general election in 1952 from the Rohtak Lok Sabha constituency and won the poll with a huge margin. In the second general elections in 1957, he again successfully contested from his old constituency of Rohtak. In 1962, he was elected to the Punjab assembly. He was inducted into the council of ministers and held the portfolios of Power and Irrigation in 1962–66 and PWD and Health in 1966–67. He is also remembered for his contribution in the creation of the Bhakra Nangal Power Project.

Upon the formation of Haryana as a new state on 1 November 1966, he shifted his political base to Haryana and became a minister. He won the Kiloi assembly seat in a by-election in 1968. He was elected to Rajya Sabha in 1972 and worked for the introduction of pension for former MPs. He remained the deputy leader of the Congress in Rajya Sabha in 1976–77. Ranbir Singh Hooda was the founder general secretary of Bharat Krishak Samaj and the All-India Backward Classes Federation. He remained the working president of the All-India Freedom Fighters Organisation till his demise.

Recognition 

Ranbir Singh Hooda had set a record for being a member of seven different houses in India's democratic history, a feat that has been registered and acknowledged by the Limca Book of Records.

On 1 February 2011, Indian National Congress President Sonia Gandhi released a postage stamp depicting him.

Death 
Ranbir Singh Hooda died at the age of 94 on 1 February 2009. He was few of the surviving members of the Constituent Assembly of India during his death. He is survived by his sons Bhupinder Singh, Inder Singh and Dharmender Singh. Two of his sons, Pratap Singh and Joginder Singh, had died earlier.

References

1914 births
2009 deaths
Members of the Constituent Assembly of India
Indian social reformers
Indian independence activists from Haryana
People from Rohtak
India MPs 1952–1957
India MPs 1957–1962
Lok Sabha members from Haryana
Prisoners and detainees of British India
Ramjas College alumni